Harmony is the seventh album by American rock band Three Dog Night, released in 1971 (see 1971 in music). The album featured two Top 10 hits: "An Old Fashioned Love Song" (U.S. #4) and a cover version of Hoyt Axton's "Never Been to Spain" (U.S. #5).

Critical reception 
Reviewing in Christgau's Record Guide: Rock Albums of the Seventies (1981), Robert Christgau wrote: "Next to Grand Funk, they're the country's top touring act, and they sell singles in the multiple millions besides. They're slick as Wesson Oil. And when they choose the right material and go light on the minstrel-show theatrics, they're fine—next to 'Maggie May,' 'Joy to the World' is the most durable single of the year. Their albums do vary—avoid the 'Joy to the World' vehicle Naturally—but I think this is the best. Even if you're hostile, you'll have to concede that any group that can string together great-but-obscure songs from Marvin Gaye, Joni Mitchell, and Moby Grape without inspiring a rush back to the originals has something going for it. Wish they'd cut the poetry reading, though."

Track listing
"Never Been to Spain" (Hoyt Axton) – 3:43
"My Impersonal Life" (Terry Furlong) – 4:22
"An Old Fashioned Love Song" (Paul Williams) – 3:21
"Never Dreamed You'd Leave in Summer" (Stevie Wonder, Syreeta Wright) – 3:41
"Jam" (Three Dog Night) – 3:47
"You" (Jeffrey Bowen, Jack Goga, Ivy Jo Hunter) – 3:00
"Night in the City" (Joni Mitchell) – 3:13
"Murder in My Heart for the Judge" (Jerry Miller, Don Stevenson) – 3:36
"The Family of Man" (Jack Conrad, Paul Williams) – 3:28
"Intro: Poem: Mistakes and Illusions" (poem by Paula Negron) / "Peace of Mind" (Nick Woods) – 3:03

Personnel
Michael Allsup – guitar
Jimmy Greenspoon – keyboards
Danny Hutton – lead vocals (tracks 2, 7, 9), background vocals
Chuck Negron – lead vocals (tracks 3, 4, 6, 9), background vocals 
Joe Schermie – bass
Floyd Sneed – drums
Cory Wells – lead vocals (tracks 1, 8, 9), background vocals

Production
Richard Podolor – producer 
Bill Cooper – engineer
Ed Caraeff - photography

Charts
Album – Billboard (United States)

Singles – Billboard (United States)

Certifications

References

Three Dog Night albums
1971 albums
Albums produced by Richard Podolor
Dunhill Records albums